is a 1980 Japanese animated science fiction adventure film based on the manga series Doraemon, particularly the first volume of the same name of the Doraemon Long Stories series. The film premiered on 15 March 1980 in Japan. It's the first feature-length Doraemon film.

Plot

Suneo shows a fossil of a dinosaur claw to everyone except Nobita. Being angry, Nobita claims he will be able to find a living dinosaur. As Doraemon refuses to help him, he digs on a hillside, but instead earns punishment from a landlord nearby who forces him to unearth a hole in the ground. He finds an egg-shaped stone underneath and quickly uses a time wrap to return it to its former form, and after warming it, the egg hatches to reveal a plesiosaur (Futabasaurus), who is subsequently named Piisuke by Nobita. Instead of immediately showing it to the others, Nobita waits for it to grow while making a deal with others. However, as Piisuke grows too large, Nobita and Doraemon hide him in the nearby lake. Worried about the risk of Piisuke being found and overwhelmed in having to take care of the dinosaur, Doraemon and Nobita transport him to 100 million years ago in the Late Cretaceous period. They are attacked by a mysterious assailant who previously tried to make a deal with Nobita to sell Piisuke, though they manage to escape. When Gian and Suneo confront Nobita about his claim about his living dinosaur, he runs into Shizuka, but after revealing that even she thinks he's lying, Nobita got furious and brings her, along with Suneo and Gian to his house to show Piisuke. Left with no proof, Nobita instead shows them Piisuke through a television monitor, but realizes that he and Doraemon had unknowingly transported Piisuke to the North American shore after the time machine was attacked by the assailant. They and the others decide to go there, but the time machine is overloaded and crashes off.

The group lands on the North American shore and finds Piisuke, proving Nobita's claim and making his friends apologize to him. Doraemon suggest the others have fun on the beach, while he quietly tries to fix the time machine. He only reveals that the time machine is broken and must be taken back to Nobita's desk in faraway Japan if they want to go back to the present time after he failed. At night, while having dinner, Gian starts singing songs and a huge Tyrannosaurus appears from the forests. Doraemon uses his Momotaro Dango (Dumplings) to tame it and orders him to go back and the group decided to travel across the land connecting North America and Asia to return home. In their way, they meet with various dinosaur species who either help or hinder their progress, such as Ornithomimus and Apatosaurus. At a cliff, they are attacked by a pack of Pteranodon, who break their bamboocopters. They are saved by several mysterious assailants, who reveal they are dinosaur hunters working for a fossil collector named Dollmanstein from the 24th century. They offer to return them back home in exchange for selling Piisuke. Refusing the deal, the group set a lure for the hunters by making mud statues of them and placing them in cars, while they escape across a river with a raft. However, they are eventually spotted and separated, with Gian, Suneo, and Shizuka captured by the hunters, while Nobita, Doraemon, and Piisuke fell from a waterfall.

Thankfully, one of Doraemon's gadgets saved the three. Leaving Piisuke behind for its safety, Doraemon and Nobita find the hunters' quarter downstream where Gian, Suneo, and Shizuka are used as baits for a Tyrannosaurus. The hunters demand that they hand over Piisuke in exchange for their lives, but the Tyrannosaurus is revealed to be the one they had previously used a Momotaro Dango for, and the group uses it to attack the hunters. The hunters are subsequently captured and imprisoned by the Future Time Patrols. Piisuke is transported to his homeland, the Late Cretaceous Japan, while Nobita and his friends bid it farewell and go back to the present day.

Cast

Release
Doraemon: Nobita's Dinosaur was released in Japan on 15 March 1980, where it was distributed by Toho. The film grossed  in Japan and was the fifth highest-grossing Japanese film of the year, and the highest-grossing animated film.

Home media
The film was first released on Laserdisc in Japan on October 18, 1989.

The film was released on VHS by Shogakukan in December 1991. It was later re-released on VHS by Pony Canyon on May 17, 1996. Pony Canyon eventually released the film on DVD on March 14, 2001. The company later re-released the film on DVD on September 3, 2010.

References

Footnotes

Sources

External links

1980 films
1980 anime films
Dinosaurs in anime and manga
Nobita's Dinosaur
Plesiosaurs in fiction
Animated films about dinosaurs
Films set in North America
Toho animated films
Films scored by Shunsuke Kikuchi